Brighton General Cemetery is located in the Melbourne suburb of Caulfield South, Victoria, but takes its name from Brighton, Victoria.

History
The Cemetery pre-dates the Caulfield Roads Board – the first official recognition of the suburb of Caulfield. Established in 1854 it became, together with St Kilda Cemetery, an alternative resting place for those who had lived south of the Yarra River. There are up 70,000 people interred, including famous Australian artists, politicians and military heroes.

The first representative of the Jewish community of the Board of Trustees was Phillip Blashki. He organised the building of the Tahara house, where the deceased were watched until buried. He instigated the idea of half-graves for children, as they were expensive and child mortality was high in the 19th century. Blashki also founded the Jewish burial society, Chevra Kadisha, still in existence today.

War graves
 the cemetery contains the identified war graves of 156 Commonwealth service personnel, 135 from World War I and 21 from World War II. Most are members of the Australian Armed Forces, but three served for New Zealand Army (1) and British Army (2).

Notable Interments
Some of the notable people buried there include:

References

 The Jews in Victoria in the Nineteenth Century, L.M. Goldman 1954
 The enduring remnant:the first 150 years of the Melbourne Hebrew Congregation, 1841–1991, Joseph Aron, Judy Arndt, Melbourne University Press, 1992 – History – 438 pages
 Phillip Blashki, A Victorian Patriarch, Gael R. Hammer, 1986

External links 
 
 Brighton General Cemetery – Billion Graves

1854 establishments in Australia
Cemeteries in Melbourne
Buildings and structures in the City of Glen Eira